Shob Bhooturey (English: Everything is paranormal; Bengali: সব ভুতুড়ে) is a 2017 Indian Bengali language horror drama directed by Birsa Dasgupta and produced by Shrikant Mohta, Mahendra Soni under the banners of Shree Venkatesh Films.The film stars Abir Chatterjee, Sohini Sarkar and Supriyo Dutta in lead roles. The film released on 8 September 2017.

Plot 
Aniket's father used to run a magazine where he would publish the supernatural incidents he had experienced. He would visit any place that has anything to do with a supernatural entity, witness the same, and pen down in his stories. But Aniket doesn't believe in ghosts and after his father's death he wants to start his own business and to close the magazine. In the meantime, something unexplainable starts taking place in a primary school of a village. The headmaster of the school seeks help from Aniket. Then Aniket promised to help reluctantly. A weird looking woman Nandini, who claims to have unusual power of seeing ghosts also joins him. He found her in the middle of road while driving. She claims that Aniket father sent her. However, Aniket initially did not believe but Nandini informed him about the hidden will of Aniket's father and by a group of incidents he discovered her strategy and took her to his team. The old editor of Aniket's father's magazine completes the team of three. All of them visit the village and find out reasons about the unexplainable incidents which eventually is related to ghosts of small kids from school. The Aniket team solves the mystery and frees the village from the curse of the kids.

Cast 
 Abir Chatterjee as Aniket Sen
 Sohini Sarkar as Nandini
 Biswajit Chakraborty as School teacher
 Koushik Kar as Robin Babu
 Supriyo Dutta as Kripa babu (Editor) 
 Ambarish Bhattacharya as Traffic Sergeant
 Ankita Majhi 
 Gambhira Bhattacharya
 Saoli Chattopadhyay
 Ida Dasgupta as Mini

Soundtrack

References

External links 
 Official Trailer on YouTube
 Shob Bhootorey Trailer launch on YouTube

2017 films
2017 horror films
Bengali-language Indian films
2010s Bengali-language films
Indian horror films
Films directed by Birsa Dasgupta